Louis George Ashbourne Serkis (born 19 June 2004) is an English actor. He is best known for his role as Alex in the 2019 fantasy adventure film The Kid Who Would Be King.

Early life
Ashbourne Serkis was born on 19 June 2004 in Haringey, North London. He is the youngest son of actor and director Andy Serkis and actress Lorraine Ashbourne with an older sister, Ruby, and an older brother, Sonny. He attends Highgate School and has a tutor when he is filming.

Career
Ashbourne Serkis began acting on television. In May 2016, he made his film debut portraying Young Hatter in Alice Through the Looking Glass. In July 2017, he portrayed Peter in the English version of Mary and the Witch's Flower, and also appeared in The Current War. In November 2018, he appeared as the wolf cub Bhoot in Mowgli: Legend of the Jungle, directed by and co-starring his father. In February 2019, he starred as Alex in The Kid Who Would Be King.

Filmography

Film

Television

References

External links
 

2004 births
Living people
21st-century English male actors
English male child actors
English male film actors
English male television actors
English voice actors
English people of Armenian descent
English people of Iraqi descent
Male actors from London
People educated at Highgate School
People from the London Borough of Haringey